Webb House may refer to:

in the United States
(by state)
William Peter Webb House, Eutaw, Alabama, listed on the National Register of Historic Places (NRHP) in Greene County
Joe and Nina Webb House, Conway, Arkansas, listed on the NRHP in Faulkner County
David Jr. and Sarah Webb House, New Canaan, Connecticut, listed on the NRHP in Fairfield County
Joseph Webb House, Wethersfield, Connecticut, listed on the NRHP in Hartford County
Webb Family Farm, Sumter, Georgia, listed on the NRHP in Sumter County
John Webb House, Anchorage, Kentucky, listed on the NRHP in Jefferson County
Webb House (Paintsville, Kentucky), listed on the NRHP in Johnson County
Byrd and Leona Webb House, Paintsville, Kentucky, listed on the NRHP in Johnson County
George Webb House, Liberty, Mississippi, listed on the NRHP in Amite County
Lewis-Webb House, Independence, Missouri, listed on the NRHP in Jackson County
Webb-Barron-Wells House, Elm City, North Carolina, listed on the NRHP in Wilson County
Alfred Webb Investment Properties, Portland, Oregon, listed on the NRHP in Multnomah County
Webb-Coleman House, Chappells, South Carolina, listed on the NRHP in Saluda County
Parks Place, College Grove, Tennessee, also known as the William Felix Webb House, NRHP-listed
McGavock-Gatewood-Webb House, Nashville, Tennessee, listed on the NRHP in Davidson County
James Webb House, Triune, Tennessee, listed on the NRHP in Williamson County
Boardman-Webb-Bugg House, Austin, Texas, listed on the NRHP in Travis County
Thomas and Mary Webb House, Lehi, Utah, listed on the NRHP in Utah County
S. Milton and Alba C. Webb House, Richmond, Utah, listed on the NRHP in Cache County
Robert B. and Estelle J. Webb House, Florence, Wisconsin, listed on the NRHP in Florence County